Pub Kamrup College (পূৱ কামৰূপ কলেজ), established in 1972, is a general degree college situated at Baihata Chariali in Kamrup district, Assam. This college is affiliated with the Gauhati University. The college fraternity as well as the locality at large is thankful to the concern doyens for their able guidance and leadership in the act of initiation of the college. Started with Arts stream, there are a total of 59 regular teachers being engaged in all the three faculties- Arts, Science and Vocational Course, and in a few professional courses in the college at a present.

Location 
It is situated at Baihata in Kamrup District, Assam. It is the junction point of two National Highways- 31 and 52. The Madan Kamdev Devalaya (remnant of the 10th- 12th century shrine, now a government recognized tourist spot) is at a distance of 3 km from the college.

Organization 
Organization is considered as the success measure of the college. In addition to the cells and committees constituted for overall functioning, Pub Kamrup College at present has the following organization, associations and forums-

 Internal Quality Assurance Cell
 National Service Scheme
 Rover & Ranger
 Associations, Forums and Centres

NAAC Accreditation 
The college has been awarded 'B' Grade with CGPA 2.67 in its second cycle of assessment during 20–22  April 2015.

Departments

Science
Physics
Mathematics
Chemistry
Statistics
Computer Science
Botany
Zoology
Food Processing and Quality Management
Software Development and System Administration
Biophysics
Food Processing and Quality Management

Arts
 Assamese
 English
History
Education
Economics
Philosophy
Political Science
Geography
Food Processing and Quality Management

Professional Course
BBA

Master's Degree
M. Sc. in Biophysics
M. Sc. in Computer Science
M. Sc. in Physics

See also 
Gauhati University
Rangia College

References

External links
http://www.pubkamrupcollege.co.in/index.html
Pub Kamrup College Library
Pub Kamrup College Teaching Staffs

Universities and colleges in Assam
Colleges affiliated to Gauhati University
Educational institutions established in 1972
1972 establishments in Assam